The Grohmannspitze is a mountain in the Langkofel Group of the Dolomites in South Tyrol, Italy.

References 

 Alpenverein South Tyrol 

Mountains of the Alps
Mountains of South Tyrol
Alpine three-thousanders
Dolomites